William Elwood Neale (20 May 1933 – October 2001) was an English footballer who played as a wing half in the Football League for Darlington, and in non-league football for North Shields. He was on the books of Sunderland without playing for their first team. He did contribute to the club's "A" team winning the 1950–51 Wearside League title and two other trophies. According to the Sunderland Echo, "right half Neale, although on the small side, used both feet, distributed the ball well, and was a bundle of energy all the way through" the final of the Monkwearmouth Charity Cup.

References

1933 births
2001 deaths
Sportspeople from Wallsend
Footballers from Tyne and Wear
English footballers
Association football wing halves
Sunderland A.F.C. players
North Shields F.C. players
Darlington F.C. players
English Football League players